The Alexander Y Type was a long-running design of single-decker bus and single-decker intercity bus bodywork built by Walter Alexander Coachbuilders in Falkirk, Scotland. It was built on a wide range of chassis between 1962 and 1983. A small number were built at Alexander's Belfast subsidiary.

From 1971 it became the AY Type (with the A signifying alloy construction) or AYS Type (with the S signifying service bus specification), although in common usage all are referred to simply as Y Type.

Chassis
The majority of Y Type bodies were fitted to Leyland Leopard chassis, and most were built for the Scottish Bus Group and its predecessors.

Other customers
As can be seen from the table above, SBG was by far the biggest customer, buying over 86% of the total output of Y Types. However other customers also existed, amongst these being the North Western Road Car Company with 75 Leopards and 30 Bristol REs, Venture of Consett with 32 Leopards and 12 Reliances, Lancaster City Council with 26 Leopards, and Potteries Motor Traction with 25 Reliances.

External links
Preserved Ex Clydeside Scottish Leyland Leopard Bus Website

Y
Buses of the United Kingdom
Intercity buses
Single-deck buses
Step-entrance buses
Vehicles introduced in 1962